Charithram Enniloode is an Indian Malayalam-language autobiographical show on Safari TV, where notable Malayalis from across the world share their success and failure stories from their personal and professional lives. The show is produced and edited by Santhosh George Kulangara.

Notable Guests

References

Malayalam-language television shows